The 2007 Penn Quakers football team represented the University of Pennsylvania in the 2007 NCAA Division I FCS football season. It was the 131st season of play for the Quakers. The team was led by Al Bagnoli, in his 16th season as head coach. The Quakers played their home games at historic Franklin Field in Philadelphia. Penn averaged 11,089 fans per game.

Schedule

References

Penn
Penn Quakers football seasons
Penn Quakers football